The 12th British Independent Film Awards, held on 6 December 2009 at The Brewery in West London, honoured the best British independent films of 2009.

Awards
The winner is bolded at the top of each section.

Best British Independent Film
 Moon
 An Education
 Fish Tank
 In The Loop
 Nowhere Boy

Best Director
 Andrea Arnold – Fish Tank
 Armando Iannucci – In The Loop
 Duncan Jones – Moon
 Jane Campion – Bright Star
 Lone Scherfig – An Education

The Douglas Hickox Award
Given to a British director on their debut feature
 Duncan Jones – Moon
 Armando Iannucci – In The Loop
 Peter Strickland – Katalin Varga
 Sam Taylor Wood – Nowhere Boy
 Samantha Morton – The Unloved

Best Actor
 Tom Hardy – Bronson
 Aaron Johnson – Nowhere Boy
 Andy Serkis – Sex & Drugs & Rock & Roll
 Peter Capaldi – In The Loop
 Sam Rockwell – Moon

Best Actress
 Carey Mulligan – An Education
 Abbie Cornish – Bright Star
 Emily Blunt – The Young Victoria
 Katie Jarvis – Fish Tank
 Sophie Okonedo – Skin

Best Supporting Actor
 John Henshaw – Looking for Eric
 Alfred Molina – An Education
 Jim Broadbent – The Damned United
 Michael Fassbender – Fish Tank
 Tom Hollander – In The Loop

Best Supporting Actress
 Anne-Marie Duff – Nowhere Boy
 Kerry Fox – Bright Star
 Kierston Wareing – Fish Tank
 Kristin Scott Thomas – Nowhere Boy
 Rosamund Pike – An Education

Best Screenplay
 In The Loop – Jesse Armstrong, Simon Blackwell, Armando Iannucci, Tony Roche An Education – Nick Hornby
 Fish Tank – Andrea Arnold
 Moon – Nathan Parker
 Nowhere Boy – Matt Greenhalgh

Most Promising Newcomer
 Katie Jarvis – Fish Tank Christian McKay – Me and Orson Welles Edward Hogg – White Lightnin' George MacKay – The Boys Are Back Hilda Péter – Katalin VargaBest Achievement In Production
 Bunny and the Bull Bronson The Hide The Imaginarium of Doctor Parnassus Katalin VargaBest Technical Achievement
 Bright Star – Cinematography – Greig Fraser Bunny and the Bull – Production Design – Gary Williamson
 Fish Tank – Cinematography – Robbie Ryan
 Moon – Original Score – Clint Mansell
 Moon – Production Design – Tony Noble

Best British Documentary
 Mugabe and the White African The Age of Stupid The End of The Line Sons of Cuba Sounds Like Teen SpiritBest British Short
 Love You More Christmas with Dad Leaving Sidney Turtlebaum WashdaysBest Foreign Film
 Let the Right One In Il Divo The Hurt Locker Sin Nombre The WrestlerRaindance Award
 Down Terrace Colin The Disappearance of Alice Creed Exam They Call It Acid''

The Richard Harris Award
 Daniel Day-Lewis

The Variety Award
 Sir Michael Caine

The Special Jury Prize
 Baz Bamigboye

References

External links
 BIFA homepage

British Independent Film Awards
2009 film awards
2009 in British cinema
2009 in London
December 2009 events in the United Kingdom